Ellenburg is a town in Clinton County, New York, United States. The population was 1,743 at the 2010 census. The town is named after the daughter of the principal proprietor. Ellenburg is on the western border of the county and is northwest of Plattsburgh. The southern part of the town is situated in the Adirondack Park.

History 

The area was first settled around 1800. Ellenburg is named for Ellen Murray, the daughter of John R. Murray, a landowner.

The town was formed from part of the town of Mooers in 1830. In 1845, part of the town was used to make the town of Clinton.

During the Cold War, Ellenburg was the location of two of the twelve Atlas ICBM missile silos under the 556th Strategic Missile Squadron based out of the Plattsburgh Air Force Base. These silos were operational from 1962-1965.

In late 2004, a wind farm was proposed by Noble Environmental Power for the northern part of the town. Construction was expected to be completed by early 2007, but due to delays it began in the spring of 2008. Noble has also built wind farms in the neighboring towns of Altona and Chateaugay. Construction of the wind farms caused some controversy within the towns, as many residents felt it would subtract from the natural beauty of the area. The wind farm includes 54 turbines producing a total output of 81 megawatts.

Geography

The western town line is the border of Franklin County.

U.S. Route 11 passes through the northeastern part of the town. New York State Route 190 (Military Turnpike) is an east-west highway, intersecting US-11 at Ellenburg village. New York State Route 374 crosses the southwestern corner of the town.

Demographics

As of the census of 2000, there were 1,812 people, 703 households, and 485 families residing in the town.  The population density was 17.0 people per square mile (6.6/km2).  There were 941 housing units at an average density of 8.8 per square mile (3.4/km2).  The racial makeup of the town was 98.79% White, 0.06% African American, 0.11% Native American, 0.22% Asian, 0.22% from other races, and 0.61% from two or more races. Hispanic or Latino of any race were 0.83% of the population.

There were 703 households, of which 30.4% had children under the age of 18 living with them, 58.6% were married couples living together, 7.1% had a female householder with no husband present, and 31.0% were non-families. 25.6% of all households were made up of individuals, and 12.5% had someone living alone who was 65 years of age or older.  The average household size was 2.57 and the average family size was 3.10.

In the town, the population was spread out, with 24.7% under the age of 18, 7.9% from 18 to 24, 27.2% from 25 to 44, 25.1% from 45 to 64, and 15.1% who were 65 years of age or older.  The median age was 38 years. For every 100 females, there were 99.8 males.  For every 100 females age 18 and over, there were 95.1 males.

The median income for a household in the town was $33,281, and the median income for a family was $37,813. Males had a median income of $29,063 versus $23,125 for females. The per capita income for the town was $16,559.  About 11.0% of families and 13.4% of the population were below the poverty line, including 15.9% of those under age 18 and 13.8% of those age 65 or over.

Communities and locations in Ellenburg 
Dannemora Crossing – A location at the eastern town line, east of Ellenburg village.
Ellenburg – The hamlet of Ellenburg is in the northern part of the town on US-11.
Ellenburg Center – A hamlet in the northern part of the town, southwest of Ellenburg hamlet.
Ellenburg Depot – A hamlet east of Ellenburg on US-11, named for the former train depot.
Ellenburg Mountain – A mountain in the southeastern corner of the town.
Gibson Corners – A location on the northern town line in the northeastern corner of Ellenburg.
Hammonds Corners – A location on the eastern town line, on NY-190.
Harrigan – A hamlet in the northwestern corner of the town inside the Adirondack Park.
Lake Roxanne – A small man-made lake east of Ellenburg village.
Merrill – A hamlet in the southwestern corner on NY-374 of the town by Upper Chateaugay Lake.
Point Bluff – A peninsula in Upper Chateaugay Lake.
Upper Chateaugay Lake – Part of the lake is in the southwestern corner of the town.

References

External links
 Town of Ellenburg official website
 Noble Ellenburg Windpark

Towns in Clinton County, New York